Robert Lloyd "Bob" Crandall (born December 6, 1935 in Westerly, Rhode Island) is an American businessman who is the former president and chairman of American Airlines. Called an industry legend by airline industry observers, Crandall has been the subject of several books and is a member of the Hall of Honor of the Conrad Hilton college.

Early life
The Great Depression forced Robert Crandall's father to leave Rhode Island to work selling life insurance, which resulted in multiple relocations.  Crandall ended attending 13 schools before  his high school graduation.
He graduated from the University of Rhode Island, and from the Wharton School of the University of Pennsylvania, with an MBA.

Airline career 
In 1966, he joined TWA, where he worked for six years. In 1972, he left to become a senior financial officer at Bloomingdale's Department Stores, but he returned to the airline industry in 1973, as senior financial vice president of American.

In 1982, he had a famous conversation with Braniff CEO Howard D. Putnam, in which he told Putnam that if Braniff raised their prices, American would too. Crandall has publicly expressed embarrassment over that conversation. That same year, Crandall became American's president. In 1985, Crandall succeeded Albert Casey as American's chairman and CEO.

During the latter period of Crandall's tenure as CEO, investor concern over airline bankruptcies and falling stock prices caused Crandall to remind his employees about the dangers of investing in airline stocks.  Known for his candor, Crandall later told an interviewer, "I've never invested in any airline.  I'm an airline manager.  I don't invest in airlines.  And I always said to the employees of American, 'This is not an appropriate investment.  It's a great place to work and it's a great company that does important work.  But airlines are not an investment.'"  Crandall noted that since the airline deregulation of the 1970s, some 150 airlines had gone out of business.  "A lot of people came into the airline business.  Most of them promptly exited, minus their money," he said.

Crandall is credited with creating the first major mileage-reward frequent flyer program in the airline industry, the AAdvantage program, as well as pioneering modern reservations systems through the creation of Sabre.  He is also credited with pioneering yield management. Crandall also serves as a senior adviser and sits on the board of AirCell, an in-flight telephony company which won the larger of two licenses for air-ground data service that provide in-flight broadband service.

In 1998, he retired from American and he went on to work as director of many other companies, including Celestica, Haliburton, and Anixter.

Criticism of deregulation 

Before the passing of the 1978 Airline Deregulation Act, Crandall was one of the act's loudest opponents. When asked to comment on deregulation in June 2008, Crandall stated:

In 2018, he stated:

Reputation for cost-cutting
While at American Airlines in the 1980s, Crandall was famed for his focus on cost-cutting. One story that has been frequently retold since is that he came up with the idea to remove one olive from every salad served to passengers. No one would notice and the airline would save $40,000 a year. Another story, which Crandall himself shared, involved cutting security at a Caribbean station warehouse to the point that the only guard left was a sound recording of a guard dog barking.

Honors and awards
 Hall of Honor of the Conrad Hilton college.
 Horatio Alger award, 1997.
 Tony Jannus Award for outstanding leadership in the commercial aviation industry, 2001.
 L. Welch Pogue Award for Lifetime Achievement in Aviation, 2004.
 Wright Brothers Memorial Trophy from the National Aeronautic Association, 2006.

References

External links

"Something Special in the Air?", PBS NewsHour, May 20, 1998
Charge More, Merge Less, Fly Better - A New York Times op-ed by Crandall, Apr 21, 2008
"A Conversation With Robert L. Crandall", DePaul University, Sep 22, 2009
 

1935 births
Living people
American airline chief executives
American Airlines people
Businesspeople from Rhode Island
University of Rhode Island alumni
Wharton School of the University of Pennsylvania alumni